KKOW-FM "96.9 The Kow" is a country station licensed to Pittsburg, Kansas, owned by American Media Investments.

History
96.9 FM was brought on the air in 1975 as KMRJ by Jim Harbart. At its inception it was an adult contemporary station broadcasting from studios on Quincy Street in Pittsburg. In 1982 the station was sold to John David and Richard Chegwin, who retained the format but changed the call letters to KDBQ.

Ownership changed again in 1984, when Tim Menowsky and Frank Bell took ownership and branded the station KQWK "Quick Rock 97" with a hybrid contemporary hit radio/album-oriented rock format.

In 1986 the station was purchased by its current owner, American Media Investments, which relocated the studios across the state line to Joplin, Missouri. With new KKOW-FM call letters, the station continued with a rock format until the studios were moved to their current location outside Pittsburg, at which time the station became "Hot Country". The station returned to KKOW-FM after a short stint as KRKN between 1989 and 1990. In 1992, KKOW adopted the "Kow" moniker that it still holds to this day.

References

External links

KOW-FM
Country radio stations in the United States
Pittsburg, Kansas